Augilmar Silva de Oliveira (born 18 February 1964), known as just Gilmar Popoca, is a Brazilian former footballer who played as an attacking midfielder. He competed in the 1984 Summer Olympics with the Brazil national under-23 football team.

Honours

Club 
Flamengo
 Campeonato Brasileiro Série A: 1983, 1987
 Campeonato Carioca: 1986

Vitória
 Campeonato Baiano: 1989

Sampaio Corrêa
 Campeonato Maranhense: 1998
 Copa Norte: 1998

International 
 Brazil
 South American U-20 Championship: 1983
 FIFA U-20 World Cup: 1983

References

1964 births
Living people
People from Manaus
Brazilian footballers
Brazilian football managers
Association football forwards
Brazilian expatriate footballers
Expatriate footballers in Portugal
Expatriate footballers in Mexico
Expatriate footballers in Bolivia
Campeonato Brasileiro Série A players
Campeonato Brasileiro Série B players
Primeira Liga players
Olympic footballers of Brazil
Footballers at the 1984 Summer Olympics
Medalists at the 1984 Summer Olympics
Olympic silver medalists for Brazil
Olympic medalists in football
Brazil under-20 international footballers
CR Flamengo footballers
Associação Atlética Ponte Preta players
Botafogo de Futebol e Regatas players
Esporte Clube Vitória players
Santos FC players
São Paulo FC players
Coritiba Foot Ball Club players
C.S. Marítimo players
Club León footballers
C.D. Veracruz footballers
Louletano D.C. players
Club Bolívar players
Sampaio Corrêa Futebol Clube players
CR Flamengo managers
Sportspeople from Amazonas (Brazilian state)